The cent (in circulation 1966–1992), formally the one-cent coin and informally the penny, was the lowest-denomination coin of the Australian dollar. It was introduced on 14 February 1966 in the decimalisation of Australian currency and was withdrawn from circulation in 1992 (along with the two-cent coin). It is still minted as a non-circulating coin.

One-cent and two-cent coins are legal tender only up to the sum of 20 cents (preventing large debts from being paid in small coins).

Description
From 1966 until 1984 the obverse featured the portrait of Queen Elizabeth II by Arnold Machin. It was changed in 1985 to a version by Raphael Maklouf, which remained until its withdrawal from circulation in 1992.

The reverse side of the coin features the image of a feathertail glider (Acrobates pygmaeus), a gliding possum unique to Australian states bordering the Pacific Ocean. The image was designed by Stuart Devlin, who designed the reverses of all of the original Australian decimal coins.

Production
The first issue (1966) was produced by three mints: 146.5 million were minted at the Royal Australian Mint in Canberra, with 239 million at the Melbourne Mint and 26.6 million at the Perth Mint. With the exception of 1966 and 1981, all other one-cent coins have been produced at the Canberra mint. In 1981, 40.3 million were struck at the British Royal Mint in Llantrisant, Wales, as well as 183.6 million in Canberra. The only year when it was not minted during its years in general circulation was 1986. It was last minted in 1990.

The decision to remove the one and two-cent coins was confirmed by the Treasurer in a Budget Speech on 21 August 1990. The action was due to inflation reducing its value, and the high cost of bronze. Around the same time other countries removed their bronze coins—New Zealand removed its one and two cent coins in 1990, while the United Kingdom and Ireland changed their bronze one and two pence coins into copper-plated steel.

The one cent coin was produced as proof and uncirculated coins in 1986, 1991, 2006 and 2010 as part of mint sets. Other compositions were also used for 1 cent coins such as the 1978 (incorrectly listed as 1968 at Downies) specimen struck in aluminium or fine silver proofs in 1991, 2006 and 2011.

After removal from circulation, the coins were melted down to make bronze medals for the 2000 Sydney Olympics.

In 2017, a limited edition Possum Magic themed coin set was released. A one-cent coin is included that shows Hush the Possum reading a book.
In 2019, a limited edition Mr Squiggle  friends themed coin set was released. A one-cent coin is included that shows Mr Squiggle.

References

 

One-cent coins
Decimal coins of Australia